Lower Magdalena Province is one of the 15 provinces in the Cundinamarca Department, Colombia. Lower Magdalena borders to the west with the Magdalena River, the Departments of Tolima and Caldas, to the north with the Boyacá Department, to the east with the Rionegro Province and Gualiva Province, and to the south with the Central Magdalena Province.

The Lower Magdalena Province contains three municipalities:
 Caparrapí
 Guaduas 
 Puerto Salgar

References

External links 
  Lower Magdalena Province in Cundinamarca

Provinces of Cundinamarca Department